James Robert Bruce Ogilvy (born 28 February 1964) is a British landscape designer, and the founder and editor of Luxury Briefing. He is a relative of the British royal family as the elder child and only son of Sir Angus Ogilvy and Princess Alexandra of Kent. His mother was a first cousin of Queen Elizabeth II, both being granddaughters of George V. As a result, he is a second cousin of King Charles III. He is currently 57th in the line of succession to the British throne.

Early life and family
Ogilvy was born in Thatched House Lodge, Richmond Park, Surrey. He was the first of four children born to royalty within a space of nine weeks in 1964, the others being Prince Edward, Lady Helen Windsor and Lady Sarah Armstrong-Jones. Ogilvy was baptised by Arthur Michael Ramsey, Archbishop of Canterbury, with Queen Elizabeth II among his seven godparents. When he was born, he was 13th in the line of succession to the British throne. As of September 2022, he is 57th.

Education and professional life
His education began in the "palace school" with his cousins Prince Edward, Lady Helen Windsor and Lady Sarah Armstrong-Jones. Subsequently, Ogilvy attended Gibbs pre-prep and Heatherdown Preparatory School (with Prince Edward). After that, Ogilvy and Prince Edward went separate ways, the prince to Gordonstoun and Cambridge, and Ogilvy to Eton College and the University of St Andrews. From St. Andrews, he earned a Scottish Master of Arts degree in History of art. He then attended the full-time MBA course at Cranfield from 1990 to 1991, obtaining the MBA qualification.

He worked for Barclays de Zoete Wedd (BZW) and then a shipping agency in Edinburgh.

He is the publisher and founder of Luxury Briefing, a magazine launched in 1996, and has served on numerous boards of directors.

Ogilvy is also a professional photographer and landscape designer.

Personal life
He married Julia Caroline Rawlinson, daughter of Charles Frederick Melville Rawlinson, of Arkesden, Essex, a merchant banker, on 30 July 1988 at St Mary's Church in Saffron Walden, Essex. The couple have two children:
 Flora Alexandra Vesterberg (born 15 December 1994 in Edinburgh, Scotland) who studied History of Art at the University of Bristol and has a masters degree from the Courtauld Institute of Art: she runs a contemporary art agency. She married Swedish financier Timothy Vesterberg at the Chapel Royal, St James's Palace on 26 September 2020 and renewed their vows the following year.
 Alexander Charles Ogilvy (born 12 November 1996 in Edinburgh, Scotland) who attended Brown University.

He is also a godfather of Princess Eugenie, the younger daughter of his second cousin, Prince Andrew, Duke of York, and Sarah, Duchess of York.

In 1997, while on holiday in Florida with his wife and children, he swam out into the ocean and was bitten by a shark. Ogilvy had several leg wounds and required 30 stitches.

Ancestry
His maternal grandparents were Prince George, Duke of Kent, the fourth son of King George V; and Princess Marina of Greece and Denmark. Princess Marina was the daughter of Prince Nicholas of Greece and Denmark and Grand Duchess Elena Vladimirovna of Russia (later known as Princess Nicholas of Greece and Denmark). He has a younger sister, Marina Ogilvy.

Honours
  6 February 1977: Queen Elizabeth II Silver Jubilee Medal
  6 February 2002: Queen Elizabeth II Golden Jubilee Medal
  6 February 2012: Queen Elizabeth II Diamond Jubilee Medal
  6 February 2022: Queen Elizabeth II Platinum Jubilee Medal

References

External links
James Robert Bruce Ogilvy in The Peerage
James Robert Bruce Ogilvy in the National Portrait Gallery
Luxury Briefing

1964 births
Living people
Alumni of the University of St Andrews
British magazine publishers (people)
People educated at Heatherdown School
People educated at Eton College
Shark attack victims